Anthony Maher (born March 18, 1979) was a soccer forward. Maher was a 10-year outdoor and indoor soccer professional and also a member of the United States National Futsal team and took part in the 2007 Pan-American Games in Brazil. Maher retired in 2013.

Amateur
He started playing soccer in Cape May County, New Jersey, as a member of the Cape Express Soccer Club. He played high school soccer at Middle Township High School in New Jersey.

College
Maher attended Mercyhurst College on an athletic scholarship.  He was a 2001 NSCAA First Team All-American and runner up for NCAA DII National Player of the Year.  He was additionally, a four-time All-GLIAC selection including Time Conference Player of the Year and All Time Goal Scorer in college history.  He was captain of the team and led Mercyhurst to two Division II NSCAA Final Fours.  While in college was a member of the USL Premier Development League (PDL) with the West Michigan Edge and set franchise records for goals (14) and points (34 points) and was named to the 2001 All PDL team.  Maher was then 1 of 2 Division II players asked to take part in the MLS Combine.

Professional career
Anthony Maher started his professional soccer career with the Wilmington Hammerheads of the USL Second Division in 2002.  He was the Hammerhead's team MVP and an All League selection his rookie season, leading the team to the National Championship Game.  That fall, Maher joined the Cleveland Force of Major Indoor Soccer League (MISL).  He was the 'Team Rookie of the Year' and also selected to the All League Rookie First Team.  In 2003, the Force traded Maher to the Kansas City Comets in exchange for Nick Corneli.  Maher was named the Comets' "Newcomer of the Year" producing 28 goals and 10 assists.  He followed that with 20 goals and 5 assists in only 14 games his second season with the Comets before tearing his anterior cruciate ligament (ACL). The Comets folded at the end of the 2004–2005 season and Maher signed with the Milwaukee Wave United of the USL A-League, playing one season with them.  He then signed with the California Cougars of MISL in the fall of 2005. He played only seven games with the Cougars before being traded to the Chicago Storm in exchange for John Ball.  Maher finished the season, playing fifteen games in Chicago.  In 2006, Maher signed with the outdoor Syracuse Salty Dogs where he was the Teams's Offensive Player of the Year and the Army Man of the Year for high work rate. The Salty Dogs folded at the end of the season and Maher moved to the Rochester Raging Rhinos.  However, he never played for Rochester due to a torn anterior cruciate ligament.  On October 17, 2006, the Storm traded Maher and Tijani Ayegbusi to the Milwaukee Wave for Randy Soderman and Alen Osmanovic.  In 2007, Maher signed with the Carolina RailHawks of the USL First Division, where he scored the team's only goal in the semifinal loss to the New England Revolution in the 2007 Lamar Hunt U.S. Open Cup.  In 2008, Maher joined the Philadelphia KiXX where he played for two seasons.  He then moved to the Chicago Riot where he began the 2010–2011 season.  In March 2011, the Riot sent Maher to the Missouri Comets.  Maher signed for the Major Indoor Soccer League club, the Syracuse Silver Knights at the end of 2011, at the halfway point of the season.

Personal
Maher is a spokesperson for Athletes in Action as well as sponsored nationally by Powerbar as a 2008 and 2009 TEAM ELITE MEMBER.  He founded the Maher Brother's Pro Touch Soccer Camps that run camp programs in southern New Jersey. Maher has also been nominated for 2008 induction into South Jersey Soccer Hall of Fame. Maher’s father, John Maher, was a top NJ HS coach and also inducted into the South Jersey Soccer Hall of fame in 2018.  Anthony is married to Wayne State College Women's Soccer player Anne Marie Collins.

His brother, Matthew Maher also plays for the Philadelphia KiXX in the MISL and had also played alongside Anthony with the RailHawks (USL-1)during the 2007 season.  Anthony and Matt were the first brothers to play against each other in the Lamar Hunt US Open Cup.

References

External links
 Philadelphia KiXX: Anthony Maher

1979 births
Living people
People from Cape May, New Jersey
American soccer players
California Cougars players
North Carolina FC players
Chicago Storm (MISL) players
Cleveland Force (2002–2005 MISL) players
Association football forwards
Kansas City Comets (2001–2005 MISL) players
Major Indoor Soccer League (2001–2008) players
Mercyhurst Lakers athletes
Middle Township High School alumni
Milwaukee Wave players
Milwaukee Wave United players
Missouri Comets players
Major Indoor Soccer League (2008–2014) players
People from Middle Township, New Jersey
Philadelphia KiXX (2008–2010 MISL) players
Rochester New York FC players
Soccer players from New Jersey
Sportspeople from Cape May County, New Jersey
Syracuse Salty Dogs players
Syracuse Silver Knights players
USL Second Division players
USL First Division players
USL League Two players
West Michigan Edge players
Wilmington Hammerheads FC players
American men's futsal players